"Wild Mountain Thyme" (also known as "Purple Heather" and "Will Ye Go, Lassie, Go?") is a Scottish/Irish folk song. The lyrics and melody are a variant of the song "The Braes of Balquhither" by Scottish poet Robert Tannahill (1774–1810) and Scottish composer Robert Archibald Smith (1780–1829), but were adapted by Belfast musician Francis McPeake (1885–1971) into "Wild Mountain Thyme" and first recorded by his family in the 1950s.

Tannahill's original song, first published in Robert Archibald Smith's Scottish Minstrel (1821–24), is about the hills (braes) around Balquhidder near Lochearnhead. Tannahill collected and adapted traditional songs, and "The Braes of Balquhither" may have been based on the traditional song "The Braes o' Bowhether".

History

The existing tune of "Wild Mountain Thyme" is significantly different from Tannahill's "The Braes of Balquhither", which was most likely based on a traditional air. In an 1854 publication, George Farquhar Graham notes that Tannahill's song was set to the air "Bochuiddar" (Balquidder), as found in Captain Simon Fraser's Collection of Melodies of the Highlands and Islands of Scotland (1816). Other scholars suggest the melody is based on an old Scottish traditional tune "The Three Carls o' Buchanan".

McPeake is said to have dedicated the song to his first wife, but his son wrote an additional verse in order to celebrate his father's remarriage. "Wild Mountain Thyme" was first recorded by McPeake's nephew, also named Francis McPeake, in 1957 for the BBC series As I Roved Out.

While Francis McPeake holds the copyright to the song, it is generally believed that rather than writing the song, he arranged an existing travelling folk version and popularised the song as his father's. When interviewed on radio, Francis McPeake said it was based on a song he heard whilst travelling in Scotland, and he rewrote it later. Bob Dylan's recording of the song cited it as traditional, with the arranger unknown, though Dylan's copyright records indicate that the song is sometimes "attributed to" McPeake.

Lyrics
The original version of the song, published in 1957, closely paraphrases the Tannahill version, which was published posthumously in 1822. Tannahill's original lyrics include a number of phrases that McPeake carried over into his song, including the lines "Let us go, lassie, go" and "And the wild mountain thyme" as he rewrote the song.

In her book Fragrance and Wellbeing: Plant Aromatics and Their Influence on the Psyche, author Jennifer Peace Rhind describes "Wild Mountain Thyme" as essentially a love song, with the line, "Wild Mountain Thyme grows among the Scottish heather" perhaps being an indirect reference to the old custom of young women wearing a sprig of thyme, mint or lavender to attract a suitor. Rhind also notes that, in British folklore, the thyme plant was the fairies' playground and often the herb would be left undisturbed for their use.

Recordings
The following is a chronological list of recordings of the song.

References

External links

 Wild Mountain Thyme (lyrics and MP3 file)

1957 songs
Scottish folk songs
Irish folk songs
The Byrds songs
Van Morrison songs
Scotland national football team songs